Namri Songtsen, also known as "Namri Löntsen" (died 618) was according to tradition, the 32nd King of Tibet of the Yarlung Dynasty. (Reign: 570 – 618) During his 48 years of reign, he expanded his kingdom to rule the central part of the Tibetan Plateau. He also had a good diplomatic partnership with other tribes and Empires. His actions were decisive in the setting up of the Tibetan Empire (7th century), to which he can be named co-founder with his son, Songtsen Gampo. He Sieged in Kingdom of Sumpa in early 7th century.

Dipolamatic Relations 
The king of southern Tibet, and donated 20,000 households to Namri Songtsen, who gave him the sovereignty of southern Tibet.

Context 
Namri Songtsen was a member of the Yarlung tribe, located to the southeast of Lhasa, in the fertile Yarlung Valley where the Tsangpo (known in India as the Brahmaputra) supported both agriculture and human life. The Tibetan plateau was, at this time, a mosaic of clans of mountain shepherds with simple nomadic organizations where intertribal fighting and razzia sorties were part of the local economy. Each clan had several chiefs. These clans had few material and cultural exchanges due to topography, climate, and distance, so each clan, located in a specified network of valleys, had its own culture with little in common with other clans. These "proto-Tibetans" were isolated from relations with the outside world, though some mountain groups to the east in Sichuan, Qinghai  and the 'Azha kingdom dwelt in border areas contiguous with, or within, the Chinese empire. Early Chinese sources appear to mention proto-Tibetan peoples in a few rare cases, if the Qiang and Rong do indeed refer to them. This changed dramatically by the beginning of Tang Dynasty, when the Tibetan kingdom becoming a powerful player in the military history of  Eastern and Central Asia.

Several Tibetan historical accounts say that it was in Namri Songtsen's time that Tibetans obtained their first knowledge of astrology and medicine from China. Others associate the introduction of these sciences with his son.  In the period, knowledge of these and other sciences came from a variety of countries, not only from China, but also from Buddhist India, Byzantium,<ref>Dan Martin, 'Greek and Islamic Medicines' Historical Contact with Tibet: A Reassessment in View of Recently Available but Relatively Early Sources on Tibetan Medical Eclecticism in Anna Akasoy, Charles Burnett, Ronit Yoeli-Tlalim (eds.)Islam and Tibet: Interactions Along the Musk Routes, Ashgate 2011,pp.117-144, p. 128.</ref> and Central Asia.

 Upbringing and life 
Around 600, Namri Songtsen, one of the several Yarlung tribal chieftains, become the uncontested leader of the several Yarlung clans. Using shepherd-warriors he subdued the neighbouring tribes one after another. Expanding his rule to all of modern Central Tibet, including the Lhasa region allowed him to rule over many groups, and to begin the establishment of a centralized and strong state, with skilled troops who gained experience in their many battles in the early 7th century. This formed an important base for the later conquests by his son, which unified the whole of the Tibetan plateau. Furthermore, Namri Songtsen relocated the capitol of his kingdom to the Gyama Valley, where he built the Gyama Palace. According to Beckwith, Namri Songtsen sent the first diplomatic missions to open relations with China, in 608 and 609.

 Military Campaigns 
Namri Songtsen one leading 10,000 Strong Forces in sumpa to attack, and destroyed faster breathing with the help of sumppa Navajo disaffected to the king's bravery and sumpa Ruler chungppo bungsae jujje. After conquering Sumpa by Siege of Sumpa, Namri Songtsen took the same steps and granted the nobles territories and slaves to gain their loyalty. Toban became the largest power in the Tibetan Plateau, and by integrating central and southern Tibet into one, it achieved the effects of population increase, economic development, and military strength, and finally transformed from a tribal state into an ancient state.

However, Toban was a feudal kingdom that did not develop into a centralized state in the end, and there was a limit to being a formally unified state due to the strong power of the nobles.

 Assassination and succession 
Namri Songtsen was assassinated by poisoning in 618 or 629/630, by a coup d'état which eventually failed, being crushed by Namri Songtsen's son, who developed his heritage, completing the submission of the Tibetan plateau, and, according to later histories, introduced a unified legal code, a Tibetan writing system, an archive for official records, an army, and relations with the outside world.

See also
Pre-Imperial Tibet 
History of Tibet
List of emperors of Tibet

Notes

 Sources 
 Josef Kolmaš, Tibet and Imperial China, A Survey of Sino-Tibetan Relations up to the End of the Madchu Dynasty in 1912. Occasional paper No. 7, The Australian National University, Centre of Oriental Studies, Canberra, 1967. Page 7-11/67. (lire en ligne, appuyer sur F11 pour l'affichage plein écran)
Stein, R. A. (1972). Tibetan Civilization''. Faber and Faber, London; Stanford University Press, Stanford, California.  (cloth); .

Tibetan kings
7th-century rulers in Asia
7th-century Tibetan people
6th-century births
629 deaths
Year of birth unknown
7th-century murdered monarchs